How The Hangman Lost His Heart is a fictitious tale which is set in mid-18th century after the Second Jacobite Rebellion and is written by K M Grant, published in 2006.

Plot 
Alice Towneley's beloved uncle, Colonel Frank Towneley, has just been executed by Dan Skinslicer for supporting Prince Bonnie Charlie during the Second Jacobite Rebellion. After the drawing and quartering, Dan expresses his sympathy towards Alice and remarks that Frank was the first condemned to have his eyes wide open during his execution.

References 
 Amazon.com: How The Hangman Lost His Heart

British historical novels
British young adult novels
2006 British novels
Novels set in the 18th century
Puffin Books books